Grace Episcopal Church, also referred to as Grace Episcopal Church and Rectory in the context of historic preservation, is a church, historic church building, and accompanying parsonage, all located in Astoria, Oregon, United States.

The church and rectory were listed on the National Register of Historic Places in 1984.

See also
National Register of Historic Places listings in Clatsop County, Oregon
Old Grace Episcopal Church Rectory

References

External links

Episcopal churches in Oregon
Churches on the National Register of Historic Places in Oregon
Houses on the National Register of Historic Places in Oregon
Gothic Revival church buildings in Oregon
Churches completed in 1885
Houses completed in 1916
National Register of Historic Places in Astoria, Oregon
1885 establishments in Oregon
Individually listed contributing properties to historic districts on the National Register in Oregon
19th-century Episcopal church buildings
Houses in Astoria, Oregon